The Bruneau-Jarbidge caldera (sometimes called a supervolcano) is located in present-day southwest Idaho. The volcano erupted during the Miocene, between ten and twelve million years ago, spreading a thick blanket of ash in the Bruneau-Jarbidge event and forming a caldera. Animals were suffocated and burned in pyroclastic flows within a hundred miles of the event, and died of slow suffocation and starvation much farther away, notably at Ashfall Fossil Beds, located 1,000 miles downwind in northeastern Nebraska, where up to two meters of ash were deposited. At the time, the caldera was above the Yellowstone hotspot.

By its uniquely characteristic chemical composition and the distinctive size and shape of its crystals and glass shards, the volcano stood out among dozens of prominent ashfall horizons laid down in the Cretaceous, Paleogene, and Neogene periods of central North America. The event responsible for this fall of volcanic ash was identified at Bruneau-Jarbidge, 1,600 kilometers west in Idaho. Prevailing westerlies deposited distal ashfall over a vast area of the Great Plains.

The evolving composition of the erupted material indicates that while it is derived in large part from molten material from the middle or upper crust, it also incorporated a young basaltic component.

Notes

References 
BBC: "Supervolcanoes" Program transcript, 3 February 2000
W. I. Rose, C. M. Riley, and S. Dartevelle, "Sizes and Shapes of 10-Ma Distal Fall Pyroclasts in the Ogallala Group, Nebraska" (pdf file) Includes bibliography.

Volcanoes of Idaho
Calderas of Idaho
Volcanism of Idaho
Yellowstone hotspot
Hotspot volcanoes
Landforms of Owyhee County, Idaho
Miocene calderas
Miocene United States
Neogene Idaho
Supervolcanoes
Extinct volcanoes

External links
Cenozoic Geology of Idaho: "The Bruneau-Jarbidge Eruptive Center, Southwestern Idaho" by Bill Bonnichsen  (pages 251-268) Idaho Bureau of Mines and Geology